Hawthorne Gospel Church in Hawthorne, New Jersey an independent non-denominational church located in northern New Jersey, within a 30-minute drive of New York City, with easy access, being located along a major highway, New Jersey Route 208. The campus in Hawthorne covers 22 acres of land and includes a 1,700-seat worship center, a school offering Pre-Kindergarten through Grade 12, sports fields, a pool, and a library.

Beliefs and Mission
The mission of Hawthorne Gospel Church is to glorify God by "Developing fully devoted followers of Jesus Christ".

The beliefs center on these ten principles:

• In the verbal inspiration of all the Scriptures, both the Old and New Testaments, and that they are the final authority in faith and life.

• In one God, eternally existing in three persons: Father, Son, and Holy Spirit.

• In the total depravity of all humanity, and the necessity of regeneration.

• That salvation is the free gift of God, entirely apart from works, and is possessed by all who by faith received the Lord Jesus Christ as their personal Savior.

• In the virgin birth of Christ, and that he is true God and true man.

• That the Lord Jesus Christ died for our sins, and that with his shed blood, he obtained for us an eternal redemption.

• In the resurrection of the crucified body of our Lord, in his ascension into heaven, and in his present life as our high priest and advocate.

• That the Holy Spirit is a divine person and that he indwells all believers.

• In the personal, pre-millennial, imminent return of our Lord Jesus Christ.

• In the bodily resurrection of the just and the unjust, the everlasting blessedness of the saved, and the everlasting punishment of the lost.

History
Hawthorne Gospel Church was founded on June 5, 1925 but has roots in a campaign in Paterson from April 4 to May 23, 1915, by evangelist Billy Sunday. As a result of the campaign, a ladies’ Bible class was begun, taught by Mrs. Alma Fischer. One of the men, waiting for his wife at the Bible class, suggested that they consider Sunday afternoon meetings that would not be held at “church time.” Although all were active in a variety of different churches, they felt the need for steady Bible teaching and to hear evangelistic messages. Two of the men would see about renting the Lafayette Avenue Fire Hall for this purpose. On June 5, 1925, the Sunday afternoon meetings for Bible study began in that Fire Hall and a few months later, Sunday School began with 24 children attending. It did not take long before the group sponsored weeknight meetings with special speakers. These meetings, held during the summers of 1928 to 1933, were conducted in tents, the first located on property on Lafayette Avenue where the Louis Bay II Library now stands. As time passed the group became more and more connected and decided that the area did need another church that would reach out to the people in the Hawthorne community. So on Thanksgiving Day, 1930, there was the dedication of a church building on Lafayette Avenue, a few doors up the street from the Fire Hall. The Hawthorne Gospel Mission as it was originally known became the Hawthorne Gospel Church in 1932.

In 1925, Hawthorne Gospel was founded.
In 1932, The Hawthorne Gospel Mission as it was originally known became the Hawthorne Gospel Church
In 1934, Hermann G. Braunlin became the first full-time pastor
In 1941, the church began a radio ministry, broadcasting the Sunday morning worship service. “Inspiration Time” was then on WPAT each weekday morning.
In 1953 the church purchased the 15 acre land on Route 208
In 1954 the congregation grew to 500 members
In 1958 the pavilion was constructed, the first building on the new property.
In 1960 the property next door was purchased and used for the Hawthorne Bible House, a Christian bookstore sponsored by the church. The total acreage on Route 208 then became 22 acres.
In 1984 the Hawthorne Christian Academy, a Pre-K thru 12 grade school was established.
In 1986 Hermann G. Braunlin became Pastor Emeritus and Pastor John W. Minnema was installed as Senior Pastor.
In 1999 three morning services were instituted in addition to the evening service with an average attendance of 2,600 each Sunday
In 2020, the church established the new Hackensack campus at the former First Baptist Church of Hackensack, NJ.

Ministries
The ministries at Hawthorne Gospel Church are "all for the purpose of pursuing Jesus Christ more in everything that we do." With a large staff and volunteers ministers, Hawthorne Gospel provides biblical teachings and worship services. It also has Bible Education classes, a 60+ church choir, orchestra, band and specialized ministries for adults, children, students, as well as mission outreach at local and global levels.

The church operates a day camp ministry, known as the Top of The Hill Day Camp which offers boys and girls entering grades 1 through 6 a well-rounded day camp program will be provided for each age group. They also have a Sports Camp at Top of the Hill Day Camp is optional and is available at no additional cost to campers entering 5th and 6th grades.

Hawthorne Christian Academy
Hawthorne Christian Academy is located on the church campus and has approximately 477 students enrolled in pre-kindergarten through grade 12.

References

External links

Evangelical churches in New Jersey
Christian organizations established in 1925
Churches in Passaic County, New Jersey